Below are the squads for the women's football tournament at the 1994 Asian Games, played in Hiroshima, Japan.

China
Coach: Ma Yuanan

Chinese Taipei
Coach: Hsieh Chih-chun

Japan
Coach: Tamotsu Suzuki

South Korea
Coach: Lee Yi-woo

References

 Results

External links
Korea Results
Japan RSSSF
China Results

1994
Squads